Mudfork is an unincorporated community in Calhoun County, West Virginia, United States. It lies at an elevation of 902 feet (275 m).

References

Unincorporated communities in Calhoun County, West Virginia
Unincorporated communities in West Virginia